Kuntur Wayin (Quechua kuntur condor, Ancash Quechua wayi house, "condor house", -n a suffix, also spelled Cóndorhuain) is a mountain in the Andes of Peru which reaches a height of approximately . It lies in the Junín Region, Tarma Province, Tarma District.

References 

Mountains of Peru
Mountains of Junín Region